Mulu in Iran may refer to:
 Mulu, Maragheh, East Azerbaijan Province
 Mulu, Kermanshah